Sarah Düster (born 10 July 1982) is a road cyclist from Germany. She participated at the 2011 UCI Road World Championships.

References

External links
 profile at Procyclingstats.com

1982 births
German female cyclists
Living people
Place of birth missing (living people)
People from Wangen im Allgäu
Sportspeople from Tübingen (region)
Cyclists from Bavaria
20th-century German women
21st-century German women